The SNCF locomotives BB 1425 to BB 1440 were a class of 1500 V DC 4 axle electric locomotives originally built for the Chemin de fer de Paris à Orléans in the 1920s.

The locomotives were used on mixed trains on lines between Paris and Bordeaux, after incorporation into SNCF the locomotives were used for shunting duties.

See also
SNCF BB 1-80, SNCF BB 100, SNCF BB 200, SNCF BB 1320 - similar locomotives, part of the same order of 200 locomotives

References

Literature

External links

E.0225
01420
Standard gauge electric locomotives of France
Railway locomotives introduced in 1927